Dhuwal (also Dual, Duala) is one of the Yolŋu languages spoken by Aboriginal Australians in the Northern Territory, Australia. Although all Yolŋu languages are mutually intelligible to some extent, Dhuwal represents a distinct dialect continuum of eight separate varieties.

Dialects
According to linguist Robert M. W. Dixon,
Dialects of the Yirritja moiety are (a) Gupapuyngu and Gumatj;
Dialects of the Dhuwa moiety are (b) Djambarrpuyngu, Djapu, Liyagalawumirr, and Guyamirlili (Gwijamil).
In addition, it would appear that the Dhay'yi (Dayi) dialects, (a) Dhalwangu and (b) Djarrwark, are part of the same language.

Ethnologue divides Dhuwal into four languages, plus Dayi and the contact variety Dhuwaya (numbers are from the 2006 census.):  
Dhuwal proper, Datiwuy, Dhuwaya, Liyagawumirr, Marrangu, and Djapu: 600 speakers
Djampbarrpuyŋu, 2,760 speakers
Gumatj, 240 speakers
Gupapuyngu, 330 speakers
Dhay'yi (Dayi) and Dhalwangu, 170 speakers

Dhuwaya is a stigmatised contact variant used by the younger generation in informal contexts, and is the form taught in schools, having replaced Gumatj ca. 1990.

Phonology

Consonants

Vowels 

Vowel length is contrastive in first syllable only.

Orthography

Probably every Australian language with speakers remaining has had an orthography developed for it, in each case in the Latin script. Sounds not found in English are usually represented by digraphs, or more rarely by diacritics, such as underlines, or extra symbols, sometimes borrowed from the International Phonetic Alphabet. Some examples are shown in the following table.

References

Yolŋu languages
Indigenous Australian languages in the Northern Territory